Follies or Folies may refer to:
 Folies Bergère, building in Paris
 Follies, 1971 musical with score by Stephen Sondheim
 Ziegfeld Follies, 1907–1931 series of elaborate theatrical revues

See also 
 Farley's Follies
 Foley (disambiguation)
 Folie (disambiguation)
 Folly (disambiguation)